The 2019–20 season was Anorthosis Famagusta's 
in the Cypriot First Division, the top division of Cyprus football. It covers a period from 1 June 2019 to 30 May 2020.

Summary

Pre-season
On 20 May 2019, Georgios Galitsios was signed with a contract until 2021.
On 22 May 2019, Andraž Struna and Vincent Bessat released from the club squad.

On 25 May 2019, Danijel Pranjić and Giorgos Economides released from the club squad.

On 26 May 2019, Oliver Buff released from the club squad.

On 28 May 2019, Theodoros Vasilakakis was signed with a contract until 2021.
On 5 June 2019, Yevhen Selin was signed with a contract until 2021.

On 10 June 2019, Ioannis Chadjivasilis was signed with a contract until 2021.

On 12 June 2019, João Víctor released from the club squad, got transferred to Umm Salal SC, with the total profit of Anorthosis Famagusta reaching €100.000.

Players

Transfers

In

 Total Spending: €51.000

Out

 Total Income: €100.000

Net Income:  €99.000

Pre-season and friendlies
In the Netherlands, and more specifically in Mill, will take place the main stage of Anorthosis Famagusta preparation, from Tuesday, July 16 until Thursday, July 30.

Competitions

Cypriot First Division

Regular season

Championship round

Cypriot Cup

References

External links

Anorthosis Famagusta F.C. seasons
Cypriot football clubs 2019–20 season